Sibbach v. Wilson & Co., 312 U.S. 1 (1941), was a decision by the United States Supreme Court in which the Court held that under American law important and substantial procedures are not substantive, rather they are still considered procedural, and federal law applies.

This was a post-Erie decision, and thus the decision whether to apply the law of the state of jurisdiction or uniform federal rules depended on whether the rule in question was procedural or substantive in nature.

See also
Erie doctrine
List of United States Supreme Court cases, volume 312

External links
 

United States Supreme Court cases
United States Supreme Court cases of the Hughes Court
Conflict of laws case law
Diversity jurisdiction case law
1941 in United States case law